Corporate Airlines Flight 5966 was a scheduled passenger flight from St. Louis, Missouri, to Kirksville, Missouri.  On October 19, 2004, the Jetstream 32 operating the flight crashed on approach to Kirksville Regional Airport due to pilot error. Thirteen people were killed.

Flight information

Flight 5966 was a flight route from St. Louis Lambert International Airport in St. Louis, Missouri, United States to Kirksville Regional Airport in unincorporated Adair County, Missouri, near the city of Kirksville. Corporate Airlines (later RegionsAir, now defunct) flew the route as part of the AmericanConnection network, an affiliate of American Airlines.

The captain was 48-year-old Kim William Sasse, a former flight instructor who had been with Corporate Airlines since 2001. He had logged 4,234 flight hours, including 2,510 hours on the Jetstream 32. The first officer was 29-year-old Jonathan Palmer, also a former flight instructor. Palmer had been hired by Corporate Airlines only three months before the accident and had 2,856 flight hours, though only 107 of them were on the Jetstream 32.

Accident
On October 19, 2004, the Jetstream 32 twin-engine turboprop flying the route crashed on the approach to Kirksville Airport.  The crash killed both pilots and 11 of the 13 passengers aboard.  The two surviving passengers were seriously injured.

Some of the 13 passengers were doctors from other states who had been due to attend a seminar at the A. T. Still University.  These included Steven Z. Miller, who was killed in the crash.  Dr. Miller was director of pediatric emergency medicine at New York-Presbyterian Hospital, a prominent figure in the "humanism in medicine" movement.

Investigation

The National Transportation Safety Board (NTSB) determined that the probable cause of the accident was: 
"the pilots' failure to follow established procedures and properly conduct a non-precision instrument approach at night in instrument meteorological conditions, including their descent below the minimum descent altitude before required visual cues were available (which continued un-moderated until the airplane struck the trees) and their failure to adhere to the established division of duties between the flying and non-flying (monitoring) pilot."

The NTSB analysis of the Cockpit Voice Recorder (CVR) suggests that both pilots were looking outside the cockpit for visual cues to the location of the airport and failed to realize how low they had descended below the minimum descent altitude. The report further states:

Contributing to the accident were the pilots' failure to make standard callouts and the current Federal Aviation Regulations that allow pilots to descend below the minimum descent altitude into a region in which safe obstacle clearance is not assured based upon seeing only the airport approach lights. The pilots' failure to establish and maintain a professional demeanor during the flight and their fatigue likely contributed to their degraded performance.

In popular culture
The television series Aircrash Confidential featured the incident in the third episode of Season 2, titled Pilot Fatigue.

The crash was also featured in season 23, episode 1 of the Canadian documentary series Mayday, titled "Deadly Exchange".

See also 

 American Airlines Flight 965
 American Airlines Flight 1420
 Korean Air Flight 801
UPS Airlines Flight 1354
Sky Lease Cargo Flight 4854

References

External links 

NTSB Preliminary Report from NTSB Aviation Accident Database
NTSB Final Report
Archived American Airlines page about Corporate 5966
Link to archived press statements by Corporate Airlines

Airliner accidents and incidents involving controlled flight into terrain
Airliner accidents and incidents in Missouri
Adair County, Missouri
Aviation accidents and incidents in the United States in 2004
Disasters in Missouri
Accidents and incidents involving the British Aerospace Jetstream
2004 in Missouri
October 2004 events in the United States
Airliner accidents and incidents caused by pilot error